Michael Graham (born 28 July 1975) is an Irish Gaelic football manager and former player. He has been the manager of the Cavan senior football team since 2018. He previously played for Cavan and was part of the team that won the Ulster Senior Football Championship in 1997.

Playing career

Club
A native of Cavan town, Graham joined the Cavan Gaels club at a young age.

Graham played in his first county final in 1998 against Mullahoran. A goal in each half gave Mullahoran the title.

Graham was captain as Cavan Gaels lost the 2000 final to Gowna, but the Gaels came back to beat the same opposition in the 2001 as Graham captained the club to their first title in 23 years. The teams met once again in the 2002 final, with Gowna coming out comfortably on top.

Cavan Gaels were back in the final in 2003, facing Mullahoran. Graham scored 1-1 and was named man of the match as the Gaels regained the title.

The Gaels faced Mullahoran again in the 2004 decider. Graham scored 1-2 and received the man of the match award as Cavan Gaels claimed another championship.

Graham scored a point in the 2005 final as the Gaels claimed their third championship title in succession. After relinquishing their crown to Mullahoran in the 2006 final, Graham played in his last county final in 2007. Cavan Gaels got the better of Gowna, giving Graham his fifth championship medal.

Inter-county
In 1996, Graham was on the Cavan under-21 team that claimed the Ulster championship and reached the All-Ireland final. On 8 September, Graham started the All-Ireland final against Kerry, scoring 1-1 as Cavan suffered a four-point loss.
 
At this stage Graham had joined the senior squad. Cavan faced Derry in the 1997 Ulster Final, and Graham started the game on the bench. Graham came on in the second half as Cavan claim their first Ulster championship in 28 years by a single point.

Cavan reached the Ulster final again in 2001, where they faced Tyrone. Graham was brought on as a substitute in the second half, and a strong finish from Tyrone meant they came out winners on a 1-13 to 1-11 scoreline.

In 2002, Cavan reached the final of the National Football League, Graham scoring 2-1 in the semi-final win over Roscommon. Graham started the final against Tyrone, with Cavan falling to a nine-point loss.

Management career

Club
Graham's first managerial job came at Butlersbridge, leading them to the Cavan Junior Football Championship in 2004. He also managed Drumalee to the Cavan Intermediate Football Championship in 2006.

Ahead of the 2016 season, Graham was appointed as manager of Longford club Mullinalaghta St Columba's. He led Mullinalaghta to their first county title in 66 years in 2016. He followed this up by winning championships again in 2017 and 2018. In 2018, Graham managed Mullinalaghta to the Leinster Club final, the first Longford club to reach that stage. Mullinalaghta caused a large upset by beating Dublin champions Kilmacud Crokes to become Leinster champions. At this stage, Graham had been announced as the next Cavan manager, but continued with Mullinalaghta until their championship ended. Graham's last game with Mullinalaghta was the All-Ireland semi-final loss to Dr Crokes in February 2019.

Cavan
Graham was announced as the manager of the Cavan senior football team on 21 August 2018, succeeding Mattie McGleenan.

Graham's first National League campaign as manager ended in relegation from the top flight after defeat to Dublin. The same year, Graham led Cavan to their first Ulster final since 2001. Cavan lost the final by five points to Donegal.

In 2020, Cavan suffered a second successive relegation after a loss to Roscommon on the final day.
Graham went on to manage Cavan to a second consecutive Ulster final. Cavan then claimed their first Ulster title since 1997, beating Donegal in the final.

Cavan's poor league form under Graham continued in 2021, ending with relegation to Division 4 after a defeat to Wicklow.

In 2022, Graham led Cavan to promotion from Division 4 at the first time of asking, and also won the league final by beating Tipperary. After exiting the Ulster championship to Donegal, Graham managed Cavan to the inaugural final of the Tailteann Cup against Westmeath. Westmeath were winners by a four-point margin.

On 8 August 2022, it was confirmed that Graham would remain manager of Cavan for another 2 years.

Honours

Player
Cavan
 Ulster Senior Football Championship (1): 1997
 Ulster Under-21 Football Championship (1): 1996

Cavan Gaels
 Cavan Senior Football Championship (5): 2001 (c), 2003, 2004, 2005, 2007

Manager
Cavan
 Ulster Senior Football Championship (1): 2020
 National Football League Division 4 (1): 2022

Mullinalaghta St Columba's
 Leinster Senior Club Football Championship (1): 2018
 Longford Senior Football Championship (3): 2016, 2017, 2018

Drumalee
 Cavan Intermediate Football Championship (1): 2006

Butlersbridge
 Cavan Junior Football Championship (1): 2004

References

1975 births
Living people
Cavan Gaels Gaelic footballers
Cavan inter-county Gaelic footballers
Gaelic football managers